Academy of the Arabic Language may refer to:

Academy of the Arabic Language in Cairo, founded in 1932
Academy of the Arabic Language in Damascus (Syria), founded in 1919
Academy of the Arabic Language in Israel, founded in 2007
Academy of the Arabic Language in Khartum (Sudan), founded in 1993
Academy of the Arabic Language in Mogadishu (Somalia); see List of language regulators
Academy of the Arabic Language in Rabat (Morocco), founded in 1962; see Modern Standard Arabic
Tunisian Academy of Sciences, Letters, and Arts (Beit Al-Hikma) (Tunisia), founded in 1983 (1992)
Iraqi Academy of Sciences (Baghdad, Iraq), founded in 1948
Jordan Academy of Arabic (Amman, Jordan), founded in 1924
Supreme Council of the Arabic language in Algeria (Algeria), founded 1996

Arabic language
 
Arab world-related lists
Arab studies